Bartley Gorman V (1 March 1944 – 18 January 2002) was a British bare-knuckle boxer. A Welsh Irish Traveller, Gorman called himself "the King of the Gypsies". Between 1972 and 1992, he reigned supreme in the world of illegal gypsy boxing. During these years, he fought down a mineshaft, in a quarry, at horse fairs, on campsites, in bars and clubs, and in the streets. Several of Gorman's relatives have become professional boxers in recent years, including Nathan Gorman, Hughie Fury and Tyson Fury.

Early life
Gorman was born on 1 March 1944, in Giltbrook, Nottinghamshire, England, to a Welsh father and Irish mother, who were both Travellers. His paternal grandfather and great-grandfather were also boxers. Gorman had his first bare-knuckle fight at the age of 12.

Career

On St Leger day in 1976, Gorman was ambushed by an armed mob and almost killed. He had turned up expecting to fight a challenger by the name of Ricky "Top Hat" Donahue, but was set upon by the group, who had reportedly been paid £25,000 to carry out the attack. Bartley detailed in his book: "I showed up at 10.30am, the agreed time, but he (Donahue) was no where to be seen. Then from out of no where 25 guys appeared with crowbars and bricks. I was beaten senseless."

Bartley Gorman and David Pearce signed to fight for the World unlicensed title after Pearce KO'd former WBA World Heavyweight Champion John Tate, in California. Gorman said; "Dave Pearce is the best gorger fighting man in Great Britain and I am King of the Gypsies, If I win I will challenge Muhammed Ali to fight for the title". This was made possible due to the links both fighters had with former Bareknuckle fighter and friend to Ali, Paddy Monaghan.

The BBBoC threatened a worldwide ban on Pearce if he took part. Pearce was forced to decline and was left subsequently devastated.

Retirement and death
Gorman claimed to remain unbeaten until his retirement from boxing in 1992, with his last fight being a draw with Graeme O'Laughlan (Kennedy). Gorman lived on a traveller site in Uttoxeter, and lived there until his death.

In popular culture
For the 2012 film The Dark Knight Rises, actor Tom Hardy revealed that he used Gorman's voice as one of the inspirations for the accent of Bane. Gorman has also been cited as the main inspiration for professional wrestler Wade Barrett's finishing move, the Bull Hammer Elbow.

Gorman's autobiography King of the Gypsies, written with the help of Peter Walsh, was completed just before Gorman's death.

Shane Meadows filmed a documentary entitled King of the Gypsies, interviewing Gorman about his life in 1995. The 1999 comedy drama A Room for Romeo Brass featuring Paddy Considine who played the part of Morrell based his accent on Gorman's.

References 

1944 births
2002 deaths
Bare-knuckle boxers
English male boxers
English people of Welsh descent
English people of Irish descent
Irish Travellers from England
Irish Traveller sportspeople
People from Bedworth